Ján Šajbidor (born 29 November 1982 in Liptovský Mikuláš) is a Slovak slalom canoeist who competed at the international level from 1998 to 2015.

He is the European champion in the men's K1 event from 2007. He also has a team bronze from 2002.

At the 2004 Summer Olympics in Athens in the K1 event he finished 10th in the qualification round, thus progressing to the semifinals. In the semifinals he finished 12th, failing to reach the top ten and the final round.

World Cup individual podiums

References

1982 births
Canoeists at the 2004 Summer Olympics
Living people
Olympic canoeists of Slovakia
Slovak male canoeists
Sportspeople from Liptovský Mikuláš